"Mi Religión" (My Religion) is a single by Puerto Rican singer and songwriter Yandel from his fourth studio album Update. It was released on May 5, 2017 under Sony Music Latin as the record's lead single. A music video premiered on May 26, 2017. The song was written by Yandel, Egbert "Haze" Rosa and Jesús Nieves, and was produced by Haze.

Composition
"Mi Religión" is a reggaeton song composed in common time ( time). It was written by Yandel, Egbert "Haze" Rosa Cintrón and Jesús Nieves Cortés. Haze and Willy Colón, producer and guitarist in Yandel's 2015 single "Encantadora", respectively, maintain their roles for "Mi Religión". According to Yandel, the song "goes back to the roots of reggaeton".

Chart performance
In the United States, "Mi Religión"  peaked at number 25 on the US Hot Latin Songs chart on July 15, 2017. Internationally, it reached number 47 on Billboards Mexico Español Airplay chart, number 27 in Venezuela, and number 93 in Spain.

Music video
The music video premiered on May 26, 2017 on Yandel's Vevo channel. The clip was directed by Puerto Rican director and designer Carlos Pérez and was filmed at the Coyote Dry Lake Bed in Barstow, California, USA. Yandel and Carlos Pérez previously worked on music videos for "Te Deseo" (2013, with Wisin), "Hasta Abajo" (2013), "Moviendo Caderas" (2014, with Daddy Yankee), and "Encantadora" (2015). The music video features Miss Universe Puerto Rico 2010 Mariana Vicente while Yandel is shown performing the song standing on the ground and while driving a luxurious car through the Mojave Desert.

Credits and personnel
Credits adapted from Tidal.
Willy Colón – acoustic guitar
Miguel Correa – assistant engineer
Edwin Díaz – assistant engineer
Mike Fuller – mastering
Andre Mendoza – assistant engineer
Jesús Nieves Cortés – songwriting
Egbert "Haze" Rosa Cintrón – producer, songwriting
Roberto "Earcandy" Vázquez – recording engineer, mixing
Yandel – lead vocals, songwriting

Charts

Weekly charts

Monthly charts

Certifications

References

2017 songs
2017 singles
Sony Music Latin singles
Yandel songs
Songs written by Yandel